Dark Clouds Over the Dachstein (German: Wetterleuchten am Dachstein) is a 1953 Austrian-German drama film directed by Anton Kutter and starring Gisela Fackeldey, Eduard Köck and Marianne Koch.

Cast
 Gisela Fackeldey as Jutta, die Herrin vom Salzerhof  
 Eduard Köck as Schäfer, genannt 'Tiroler'  
 Marianne Koch as Christl, die junge Magd  
 Pero Alexander as Hannes Khäls von Khälsberg, Großknecht  
 Joseph Egger 
 Jutta Bornemann as Cilly, Hausmagd  
 Hans Brand 
 Hans Hais
 Etta Werner 
 Otto Glaser 
 Harry Kupetz 
 Hans Loitzl as Peter  
 Lucia Maierl 
 Margarethe Jandl 
 Oskar Hillbrand 
 Lothar Burmester

References

Bibliography 
 Fritsche, Maria. Homemade Men in Postwar Austrian Cinema: Nationhood, Genre and Masculinity. Berghahn Books, 2013.

External links 
 

1953 films
1953 drama films
Austrian drama films
German drama films
West German films
1950s German-language films
Films directed by Anton Kutter
Austrian black-and-white films
German black-and-white films
1950s German films